William Arthur Black  ( – 1 July 2020) was a New Zealand fixed-wing and helicopter pilot. He was one of the pioneers of live deer capture from helicopters in Fiordland in the 1960s, and was involved in over 500 search and rescue operations. In the 1977 Queen's Silver Jubilee and Birthday Honours, he was appointed a Member of the Order of the British Empire, for services to search and rescue operations, and in 2014 he was awarded the Jean Batten Memorial Trophy by the Honourable Company of Air Pilots for his contributions to New Zealand aviation.

Black died in Invercargill on 1 July 2020, aged 76 years.

References

1940s births
2020 deaths
People from Te Anau
New Zealand aviators
Helicopter pilots
New Zealand Members of the Order of the British Empire